Sarah Fabyan and Alice Marble successfully defended their title, defeating Helen Jacobs and Billie Yorke in the final, 6–1, 6–0 to win the Ladies' Doubles.

Seeds

  Sarah Fabyan /  Alice Marble (champions)
  Helen Jacobs /  Billie Yorke (final)
  Jadwiga Jędrzejowska /  Simonne Mathieu (first round)
  Jean Nicoll /  Betty Nuthall (semifinals)

Draw

Finals

Top half

Section 1

Section 2

Bottom half

Section 3

The nationality of Miss M Law is unknown.

Section 4

References

External links

Women's Doubles
Wimbledon Championship by year – Women's doubles
Wimbledon Championships - Doubles
Wimbledon Championships - Doubles